Arbib is a surname. Notable people with the surname include:

 Mark Arbib (born 1971), Australian politician
 Sir Martyn Arbib (born 1939), British businessman
 Michael A. Arbib (born 1940), British computer scientist
 Richard Arbib (1917–1995), American industrial designer
 Robert S. Arbib Jr. (1915–1987), American ornithologist and writer

See also 
 Luigi Arbib Pascucci, Italian tank commander during World War Two